The Ministry of Interior and National Security is the branch of the Palestinian National Authority (PNA) cabinet in charge of the security and the statistics of the population of the Palestinian National Authority. The Palestinian Central Bureau of Statistics (PCBS) is a sub-branch of the Interior Ministry that has the responsibility for the population and economic statistics of the Palestinian territories. Since Hamas' takeover of Gaza, the position of the Interior Ministry within the Palestinian Security Services is unclear.

History
In 2006, the Israeli Defense Forces struck the office building of the Interior Ministry multiple times as a part of a bombing campaign in Gaza. The attacks were in response to the kidnapping of Gilad Shalit, an Israeli soldier.

In June 2007, the office in Gaza was taken by Said Seyam as part of the Hamas government of June 2007. Fathi Hamad took office in January 2009, following assassination of Said Seyam on 15 January 2009 during the Gaza War. In August 2012, following government reshuffle by Prime Minister Ismail Haniyye, Fathi Hamad remained in position.

Table of Interior Ministers in the Palestinian Authority

Table of Interior Ministers in West Bank

Table of Interior Ministers in Gaza

See also 
 Palestinian Security Services
 Foreign Minister of the Palestinian Authority
 Finance Minister of Palestinian Authority

External links
 Official Interior Ministry Website (Gaza Strip)

References 

Law enforcement in the State of Palestine
Organizations based in Ramallah
Internal affairs ministries